Saint-Cornier-des-Landes is a former commune in the Orne department in the Normandy region in north-western France. On 1 January 2015, Saint-Cornier-des-Landes and six other communes merged becoming one commune called Tinchebray-Bocage.

See also
Communes of the Orne department

References

Saintcornierdeslandes